The 40th Armored Division was a division of the United States Army National Guard from July 1954 until 1967.

History

After its return from the Korean War, the 40th Infantry Division was reorganized on 1 July 1954 as the 40th Armored Division.

In August 1965 the division was deployed to help suppress the Watts riots.

On 1 December 1967, a major reorganization of the National Guard reduced the Guard to eight combat divisions, with the 40th Armored Division as one of the units designated for inactivation. On 29 January 1968, the Division was eliminated and the 40th Infantry Brigade and 40th Armored Brigade were organized.

1956 order of battle 

 Division Headquarters
 40th Military Police Company
 40th Armored Signal Company
 140th Replacement Company
 132d Armored Engineer Battalion
 40th Armored Division Train
 40th Armored Quartermaster Battalion
 40th Armored Ordnance Battalion
 40th Armored Medical Battalion
 40th Armored Division Band

 Combat Command A
 111th Reconnaissance Battalion
 160th Armored Infantry Battalion 
 161st Armored Infantry Battalion

 Combat Command B
 133d Tank Battalion
 134th Tank Battalion
 224th Armored Infantry Battalion

 Combat Command C
 139th Tank Battalion
 140th Tank Battalion
 223rd Armored Infantry Battalion

 Division Artillery
 215th Anti-Aircraft Artillery Battalion
 143d Armored Field Artillery Battalion
 214th Armored Field Artillery Battalion 
 215th Armored Field Artillery Battalion 
 225th Armored Field Artillery Battalion

1967 order of battle 

 Division Headquarters
 132nd Engineer Battalion
 240th Signal Battalion
 140th Aviation Battalion
 40th Armored Division Band
 1st Brigade
 1st Battalion, 160th Infantry
 2nd Battalion, 160th Infantry
 3rd Battalion, 160th Infantry
 1st Battalion, 185th Armor
 3rd Battalion, 185th Armor
 2d Brigade
 4th Battalion, 160th Infantry
 2d Battalion, 185th Armor
 1st Reconnaissance Squadron, 18th Armored Cavalry
 1st Squadron, 111th Cavalry
 3d Brigade
 4th Battalion, 185th Armor
 5th Battalion, 185th Armor
 6th Battalion, 185th Armor
 Division Artillery
 1st Battalion, 144th Field Artillery
 2d Battalion, 144th Field Artillery
 3d Battalion, 144th Field Artillery
 4th Battalion, 144th Field Artillery 
 5th Battalion, 144th Field Artillery
 Division Support Command
 40th Medical Battalion
 40th Maintenance Battalion
 123d Maintenance Company
 40th Supply and Transportation Battalion
 540th Administration Company
 40th Military Police Company

Notes

References
 Wilson, John B. (1997). Maneuver and Firepower: The Evolution of Divisions and Separate Brigades. Washington, DC: Center of Military History.

40th Armored Division, U.S.
40
40
Military units and formations established in 1954
Military units and formations disestablished in 1967